Tenth may refer to:

Numbers
 10th, the ordinal form of the number ten
 One tenth, or 0.1, a fraction, one part of a unit divided equally into ten parts.
 the SI prefix deci-
 tithe, a one-tenth part of something
 1/10 of any unit of measurement, in particular:
 One ten-thousandth of an inch

Music
 The note, ten scale degrees from the root (current note, in a chord)
 The interval, major or minor, between the first and tenth note of a diatonic scale; an octave (seven scale degrees) plus a third
 The chord (music), created by a triad plus the tenth note from chord root
 Tenth (The Marshall Tucker Band album), the tenth album by The Marshall Tucker Band
 .1 (EP)

Other uses
 The Tenth, a fictional superhero appearing in American comic books
 Tenth (administrative division), a geographic division used in the former American Province of West Jersey
 The Talented Tenth, a leadership class of African Americans in the early 20th century
 Tenth Island, Tasmania

See also
 1/10 (disambiguation)
 Tenth Amendment to the United States Constitution
 Double Tenth (disambiguation)